The tramway Class 7000 are a series of articulated trams ordered by the ATM to be used on the Turin light rail network.

A quantity of 100 was ordered in 1981 from Fiat Ferroviaria (then in Savigliano), to be fitted with AEG electrical equipment, and the first car was delivered in February 1983.

However, the building of the five light rail lines originally planned was stopped after the opening of the first line (No. 3) in 1987. As the 7000s could not be used on the traditional tram lines because of their dimensions and weight, the order was truncated at 51 units, and the other units were substituted by the 5000 series.

At the beginning of December 2013, GTT announced the planned withdrawal of these trams, due to their high maintenance costs and the lack of spare parts on the market, to take effect on 7 December.

References

External links 

 Tram di Torino - Tram serie 7000 

Tram vehicles of Italy
Light rail vehicles
Transport in Turin
Fiat Ferroviaria
600 V DC multiple units